TYT may refer to:
 Tahoe–Yosemite Trail, Sierra Nevada, California, U.S.
 Tày Tac language (ISO 639:tyt), spoken in Vietnam
 The Young Turks, an American news commentary show
 Treinta y Tres Airport (IATA: TYT), Treinta y Tres, Uruguay
 TYT (Take Your Time), publications by Studio Olafur Eliasson
 TYT Bank, a bank in Turkey
 Tuan Yang Terutama (English: His Most Excellency), style of the Yang di-Pertua Negeri, governors of the Malaysian states